Bengt Hambraeus (Stockholm, Sweden, January 29, 1928 – Glen Roy, Ontario, (in Glengarry County), near Montreal, Quebec, Canada, September 21, 2000) was a Swedish-Canadian organist, composer and musicologist.

Biography
Hambreaus studied organ with Alf Linder and musicology with Carl-Allan Moberg, earning his doctorate in 1956 on a thesis about medieval musical notation. From 1957 to 1972 he worked at the music department of the Swedish Radio, eventually holding executive and producer posts, and during this time became a very high-profile emissary of new music in Sweden, encouraging discussion of new musical forms, a renewal of organ music with new tonal/technical concepts and the integration of performance art, improvisation, live electronics and stereo/spatial effects into traditional concert performing. He was also a prolific composer.

In 1972 he became professor of composition at McGill University, Montreal and he remained in Canada until his death in 2000. Among his notable pupils are composer Peter Allen and pianist Richard Hunt.

He was elected into the Royal Swedish Academy of Music in 1967 and received the Swedish Royal Medal Litteris et Artibus in 1986.

Hambraeus wrote music for a large number of instruments, but he is perhaps best known for his organ works. Together with Mauricio Kagel and György Ligeti he was among the first to use high modernist compositional methods to compose organ music.  Limelight Records released his Constellations and Interferences on LP.

Selected works
 1958 Constellations I
 1959 "constellations II for organ sounds" (Lp Cat No. Philips 838 750 AY)
 1961-62 Interferenzen (interferences for the organ) Lp Cat No. Philips 838 750 AY
 1966-67 Tre Pezzi per Organo
 1969 Nebulosa
 1974 Ricercare per organo
 1981 Livre d'orgue (4 volumes)
 1992 Missa pro organo: in memoriam Olivier Messiaen
 1998 Quintette pour clarinette et quatuor à cordes, le tombeau de Max Reger
 1999 Riflessioni per organo grande''

References

External links
 Bengt Hambraeus at Canadian Music Centre
Bengt Hambraeus at Swedish Music Information Center
 Bengt Hambraeus page

1928 births
2000 deaths
20th-century classical composers
Litteris et Artibus recipients
Academic staff of McGill University
Members of the Royal Swedish Academy of Music
Musicians from Stockholm
Swedish classical composers
Swedish male classical composers
20th-century Swedish male musicians
20th-century Swedish musicians